Lawrence Louis Henry Cahan (December 25, 1933 – June 25, 1992), was a Canadian professional ice hockey player who played in the National Hockey League and World Hockey Association with the Toronto Maple Leafs, New York Rangers, Oakland Seals, Los Angeles Kings, and Chicago Cougars.

Early life 
Cahan was born in Fort William, Ontario.

Career 
Cahan's professional playing career lasted from 1953 to 1974. On January 13, 1968, while playing with the Oakland Seals against the Minnesota North Stars, Cahan was involved in the accident that caused the death of Bill Masterton.

Personal life 
Cahan died on June 25, 1992 at his home in Coquitlam, British Columbia, Canada from a short-term illness.

Career statistics

Regular season and playoffs

References

External links

1933 births
1992 deaths
Baltimore Clippers players
Buffalo Bisons (AHL) players
Canadian ice hockey defencemen
Chicago Cougars players
Ice hockey people from Ontario
Sportspeople from Thunder Bay
Los Angeles Kings players
New York Rangers players
Oakland Seals players
Pittsburgh Hornets players
Seattle Totems (WHL) players
Springfield Indians players
Toronto Maple Leafs players
Vancouver Canucks (WHL) players